Jackson County is a county in the U.S. state of Texas. As of the 2020 census its population was 14,988. Its county seat is Edna. The county was created in 1835 as a municipality in Mexico and in 1836 was organized as a county (of the Republic of Texas). It is named for Andrew Jackson, President of the United States from 1829 to 1837.

Geography

Major highways

  U.S. Highway 59
  Interstate 69 is currently under construction and will follow the current route of U.S. 59 in most places.
  State Highway 35
  State Highway 111
  State Highway 172
  Farm to Market Road 234
  Farm to Market Road 616
  Farm to Market Road 1862

Adjacent counties
 Colorado County (north)
 Wharton County (northeast)
 Matagorda County (southeast)
 Calhoun County (south)
 Victoria County (southwest)
 Lavaca County (northwest)

Demographics

Note: the US Census treats Hispanic/Latino as an ethnic category. This table excludes Latinos from the racial categories and assigns them to a separate category. Hispanics/Latinos can be of any race.

As of the census of 2000, there were 14,391 people, 5,336 households, and 3,889 families residing in the county.  The population density was 17 people per square mile (7/km2).  There were 6,545 housing units at an average density of 8 per square mile (3/km2).  The racial makeup of the county was 76.49% White, 7.64% Black or African American, 0.39% Native American, 0.39% Asian, 0.06% Pacific Islander, 12.65% from other races, and 2.39% from two or more races.  24.68% of the population were Hispanic or Latino of any race. 17.9% were of German, 10.8% American, 9.3% Czech, 6.0% Irish and 5.6% English ancestry according to Census 2000. 81.6% spoke English and 17.4% Spanish as their first language.

There were 5,336 households, out of which 34.70% had children under the age of 18 living with them, 58.20% were married couples living together, 10.50% had a female householder with no husband present, and 27.10% were non-families. 24.20% of all households were made up of individuals, and 12.50% had someone living alone who was 65 years of age or older.  The average household size was 2.65 and the average family size was 3.15.

In the county, the population was spread out, with 27.40% under the age of 18, 8.20% from 18 to 24, 26.10% from 25 to 44, 22.30% from 45 to 64, and 15.90% who were 65 years of age or older.  The median age was 37 years. For every 100 females there were 96.70 males.  For every 100 females age 18 and over, there were 93.40 males.

The median income for a household in the county was $35,254, and the median income for a family was $42,066. Males had a median income of $32,639 versus $19,661 for females. The per capita income for the county was $16,693.  About 12.20% of families and 14.70% of the population were below the poverty line, including 19.10% of those under age 18 and 15.60% of those age 65 or over.

Communities

Cities
 Edna (county seat)
 Ganado
 La Ward

Census-designated places
 Lolita
 Vanderbilt

Unincorporated communities
 Francitas
 La Salle

Ghost town
 Texana

Politics
Jackson County has voted Republican in every presidential election since 1980, often by landslide margins.

See also

 List of museums in the Texas Gulf Coast
 National Register of Historic Places listings in Jackson County, Texas
 Recorded Texas Historic Landmarks in Jackson County

References

External links
 Danish Heritage Preservation Society
 Jackson County government's website
 
 "Jackson County Profile" from the Texas Association of Counties 

 
1836 establishments in the Republic of Texas
Populated places established in 1836